Altair is a star in the Aquila constellation.

Altair may also refer to:

Organizations
 Altair Airlines, a regional airline that operated out of Philadelphia, Pa., US, from 1967 to 1982
 Altair Semiconductor, a developer of 4G cellular communication semiconductors
 Altair Nanotechnologies Inc., manufacturer of energy storage systems
 Altair Engineering, an American product design and development, engineering software and cloud computing software company
 4th Army Aviation Regiment "Altair", Italy

Entertainment
 Altair (film) a 1956 drama film
 Altair: A Record of Battles, a Japanese manga series
 Somewhere at the Bottom of the River Between Vega and Altair, an album by La Dispute

Fiction

Fictional characters
 Altaïr Ibn-LaʼAhad, a character in the Assassin's Creed video game series
 Altair, a character in the video game Bomberman 64
 Altair the Black Knight, a character in the anime series Gear Fighter Dendoh
 Ratchet Altair, a character in the Sakura Wars universe
 Altair, a Mecha in the series Zegapain
 Altair, a form taken by the Japanese television character Kamen Rider Zeronos
 Altair, the name of one of Sheik Ilderim's horses in Ben Hur
 Altair, a mechanical bakugan in Bakugan new vestroia
 Altair, the name of a dragon in the video game Spyro The Dragon
 Altair, the main antagonist of the anime Re:Creators

Other uses in fiction
 Altair, a location in the Final Fantasy II video game
 Altair IV, the planet on which the film Forbidden Planet is set
 Altair 4, a planet with almost no air, in Stephen King's Science Fiction book The Tommyknockers

Places
 Altair, São Paulo, a city in Brazil
 Jabal al-Tair Island, an island in the Red Sea
 Altair, Texas, a town in Colorado County, Texas, US
 Altair (Building), Colombo, Sri-Lanka

People
 Altair Gomes de Figueiredo (born 1938), nickname Altair, Brazilian Football player
 Altaír Jarabo (born 1986), Mexican actress

Technology
 Al-Ta'ir (satellite), an Iraqi satellite whose fate remains unknown
 Luch (satellite), a series of Russian relay satellites also known as Altair
 Altair 8800, known as the microcomputer that sparked the microcomputer revolution
 Altair BASIC, a BASIC interpreter for the microcomputer
 Altair (rocket stage), a rocket engine used in several anti-satellite weapons

Vehicles
 Altair (spacecraft), a lunar lander
 USS Altair, several US Navy ships
 USNS Altair (T-AKR-291), later SS Altair (T-AKR-297), a cargo ship of the US Navy's Military Sealift Command
 Lockheed Altair, an aircraft
 Altair (yacht), a schooner designed by William Fife
 Beriev Be-200 or Beriev Be-200 Altair, a multipurpose amphibious aircraft
 Piper PiperJet Altaire, a single-engined very light jet
 Altair (ship), Mexican oceanographic research vessel

Other uses
 Operation ALTAIR, a Canadian military operation
 Altair, a planet central to the New Age spiritual beliefs of Francis Younghusband
 Marine Scientific Research Institute of radioelectronics or MNIIRE Altair design bureau, developer of naval SA missile systems and radars

 ALTAIR, a radar tracking station on Roi-Namur island in the north part of the Kwajalein atoll in the Marshall Islands
 "Altair 4", a song by Blind Guardian on the album Tales from the Twilight World
 Altair magazine, an Australian science fiction magazine edited by Robert N. Stephenson (ran seven issues, the last being a double issue #6/7)

See also
 Altar (disambiguation)

Unisex given names